Berner Au is a small river of Hamburg, Germany. It flows into the Wandse near Tonndorf (a district of Wandsbek).

See also
List of rivers of Hamburg

Rivers of Hamburg
Rivers of Germany